The Rickey Smiley Show is an American television sitcom that aired on TV One and premiered September 18, 2012. The series stars Rickey Smiley, J. Anthony Brown, Noree Victoria, Demetria McKinney, Lil' JJ, Ajiona Alexus, Gabriel Burgess, Roz Ryan, and Ray J. The Rickey Smiley Show was renewed for a 26 episode second season in March 2013, that premiered on July 26, 2013. In April 2015, the series was canceled after three seasons.

Cast
 Rickey Smiley as Himself, Bernice Jenkins, Lil' Darryl, Pastor Williams, Clarence the Janitor, T-Bagz and Joe Willie
 J. Anthony Brown as Maurice
 Noree Victoria as Simone
 Demetria McKinney as Monica
 Lil' JJ as  Brandon
 Ajiona Alexus as De’Anna
 Gabriel Burgess as Aaron
 Roz Ryan as Aunt Sylvia
 Ray J. as Kenny
 Jason Weaver as Dollar Andre
 Luenell as Luenell

Episodes

Season 1 (2012)

Season 2 (2013)

Season 3 (2014)

References

External links

2010s American black sitcoms
2012 American television series debuts
2014 American television series endings
TV One (American TV channel) original programming
Television shows filmed in Atlanta